Matilda or Mathilda may refer to:

Animals
 Matilda (chicken) (1990–2006), World's Oldest Living Chicken record holder
 Mathilda (gastropod), a genus of gastropods in the family Mathildidae
 Matilda (horse) (1824–1846), British Thoroughbred racehorse 
 Matilda, a dog of the professional wrestling tag-team The British Bulldogs

Arts and entertainment

Fictional characters
 Matelda, also spelled Matilda, a character from Dante Alighieri's Divine Comedy
Matilda, a comic strip character from Dennis the Menace and Gnasher
 Matilda, a house robot in Robot Wars
 Matilda Wormwood, title character of Roald Dahl's novel Matilda
 One of the main characters from the Finnish game series Angry Birds

Film
 Matilda (1978 film), an American comedy 
 Matilda (1996 film), based on Roald Dahl's novel
 Matilda (2017 film), а Russian historical romantic drama
 Matilda the Musical (film) a Netflix adaptation of Matilda the Musical

Literature
Matilda (Normanby novel), an 1825 novel by Lord Normanby 
 Matilda (novel), a 1988 children's novel by Roald Dahl
 Mathilda (novella), the second long work of fiction of Mary Shelley

Music
 Matilda (album), by Stateless, 2011
 "Matilda" (calypso song), a calypso lamenting a woman
 "Matilda" (alt-J song), 2012
 "Matilda" (Harry Styles song), 2022

Other uses in arts and entertainment
 Matilda the Musical, a 2010 stage musical based on Roald Dahl's novel
 Matilda Awards, Australian performance awards

People 
 Matilda (name) (also Mathilda and Mathilde), a female given name
 Empress Matilda (1102–1167), claimant to the English throne
 Matilda, Countess of Angus (fl. 13th century), Scottish noblewoman
 Matilda, Countess of Rethel (1091–1151), French noblewoman
 Matilda Allison (1888-1973), American blind educator
 Matilda of Amboise (c. 1200 ‒ 1256), French noblewoman
 Matilda of Andechs (died 1245), daughter of Margrave Berthold I of Istria
 Matilda of Anjou (c. 1106 – 1154), Duchess of Normandy
 Matilda of Bavaria (disambiguation), several people
 Matilda of Béthune (died 1264), countess of Flanders
 Matilda of Boulogne (disambiguation), several people
 Matilda of Brunswick-Lüneburg (1276–1318), a German noblewoman
 Matilda of Carinthia (died 1160 or 1161), daughter of Engelbert, Duke of Carinthia
 Matilda of England, Duchess of Saxony (1156–1189), daughter of Henry II
 Matilda of Flanders (–1083), wife of William the Conqueror
 Matilda of France (943–981/982), member of the Carolingian dynasty
 Matilda of Franconia (c. 1027 – 1034), daughter of Emperor Conrad II 
 Matilda of Frisia (died 1044), wife of Henry I, King of the Franks
 Matilda of Ringelheim (–968), or Saint Matilda, a Saxon noblewoman
 Matilda of Scotland (–1118), wife of Henry I
 Matilda of Tuscany (1046–1115), Margravine of Tuscany
 Matilda of Vianden, Lady of Požega (-after 1255), wife of John Angelos of Syrmia

Transportation and military 
 
 MATILDA, a remote-controlled surveillance and reconnaissance robot
 Matilda I (tank), a British infantry tank 1938–1940
 Matilda II, a British infantry tank 1939–1955
 , the name of two Royal Navy ships
 Matilda (ship), the name of several ships

Other uses
 Australia women's national soccer team, nicknamed Matildas
 Matilda (mascot), the mascot of the 1982 Commonwealth Games in Australia
 Matilda Cruises, an Australia ferry and cruise service
 Matilda International Hospital, in Hong Kong

See also 

 Mathilde (disambiguation)
 Matilde